Incurvaria vetulella is a moth of the  family Incurvariidae. It is found in Fennoscandia, Russia, Germany, Poland, the Czech Republic, Slovakia, Austria, Switzerland, Slovenia, Romania and Bulgaria. In the east, the range extends to Japan.

The wingspan is 16–21 mm. Adults are on wing from June to July.

The larvae feed on Vaccinium species, including Vaccinium myrtillus and Vaccinium vitis-idaea.

References

External links
Lepiforum.de

Moths described in 1839
Incurvariidae
Moths of Asia
Moths of Europe
Taxa named by Johan Wilhelm Zetterstedt